The 44th Battalion (Manitoba), CEF, was an infantry battalion of the Canadian Expeditionary Force during World War I.

History 
The 44th Battalion was authorized on 7 November 1914 and embarked for Great Britain on 23 October 1915. It disembarked in France on 12 August 1916, where it fought as part of the 10th Canadian Brigade, 4th Canadian Division in France and Flanders until the end of the war. The battalion was disbanded on 15 September 1920.

In August 1918, the 44th Battalion was renamed the 44th Battalion (New Brunswick), CEF.

The 44th Battalion recruited in and was mobilized at Winnipeg, Manitoba.

The 44th Battalion had three Officers Commanding:
Lt-Col. E.R. Wayland, 22 October 1915 – 11 December 1915
Lt.-Col. J.H. Sills, 27 December 1915 – 16 January 1917
Lt.-Col. R.D. Davies, DSO, 22 January 1917-Demobilization

Battle Honours 
The 44th Battalion was awarded the following battle honours:
SOMME, 1916
Ancre Heights
Ancre, 1916
ARRAS, 1917, '18
Vimy, 1917
HILL 70
Ypres 1917
Passchendaele
AMIENS
Scarpe 1918
Drocourt-Quéant
HINDENBURG LINE
Canal du Nord
VALENCIENNES
FRANCE AND FLANDERS, 1916-18

Perpetuation 
The 44th Battalion (Manitoba), CEF, is perpetuated by The Royal Winnipeg Rifles.

See also 

 List of infantry battalions in the Canadian Expeditionary Force

References

Sources
Canadian Expeditionary Force 1914-1919 by Col. G.W.L. Nicholson, CD, Queen's Printer, Ottawa, Ontario, 1962

044
Military units and formations of Manitoba